Talita Fontoura Alves (b. 1966) is a Brazilian botanist. She is a professor of biology and botany at the State University of Santa Cruz in Ilhéus, Brazil. She is notable for the discovery and naming of Quesnelia alborosea, a member of the Bromeliaceae native to the Bahia area of Brazil.

Biography
In 1988, Fontoura obtained her Licentiate from the Universidade Santa Úrsula in Rio de Janeiro. She obtained her master's degree in ecology under the supervision of Dr. Fábio Rúbio Scarano at the University of Campinas in 1995, and finally her Doctorate in 2005, also at the University of Campinas. To finish her education, she conducted her postdoctoral studies at Federal University of Rio de Janeiro.

Since 1996, she has tenured as a professor at the State University of Santa Cruz in Ilhéus, Bahia, and continues to contribute to the fields of ecology in biodiversity and conservation. Her field of research is the structure and community of epiphytes. She has begun research on Bromeliaceae at the Rio de Janeiro Botanical Garden into the different aspects of that family of plants such as their phytogeography and frugivory.

Notes

Footnotes

Citations

External links
 

Botanists with author abbreviations
1966 births
20th-century Brazilian botanists
Brazilian ecologists
Women botanists
Women taxonomists
Brazilian phytogeographers
Brazilian curators
Brazilian women scientists
State University of Campinas alumni
Federal University of Rio de Janeiro alumni
Academic staff of the Federal University of Rio de Janeiro
21st-century Brazilian women scientists
Living people
21st-century Brazilian botanists